Enrique O'Neil was Mayor of Ponce, Puerto Rico, from 1866 to 1867.

Mayoral term
Enrique O'Neil is best known for having adopted a complete plan for urban remodeling for the city of Ponce in 1867. The plan was adopted with the help of Spanish military engineer Félix D'Ors. It was influenced by remodeling plans in Paris, Barcelona, and Madrid. Part of the legacy of that plan are the chamfered street corners evident throughout the city. Jorge Rigau has stated that these features "signaled the city's coming of age as a modern urban entity."

See also

List of mayors of Ponce, Puerto Rico
List of Puerto Ricans

References

Further reading
 Ramon Marin. Las Fiestas Populares de Ponce. Editorial Universidad de Puerto Rico. 1994.

External links
 Guardia Civil española (c. 1898) (Includes military ranks in 1880s Spanish Empire.)

Mayors of Ponce, Puerto Rico
Year of birth missing
Year of death missing